San Dorligo della Valle (Triestine:  or ) is a comune (municipality) in the Italian region Friuli-Venezia Giulia, located about  southeast of Trieste, on the border with Slovenia.

Name 

The Slovene name of the town, Dolina, means 'valley'. This was the official name in Italian, as well, until it was renamed to San Dorligo Della Valle in 1923, as part of the policies of Fascist Italianization. In the local Italian Triestine dialect, the village has always been referred to simply as Dolina. In 2003, the denomination Dolina was adopted as the official name of the settlement in both languages; however, the municipality is still called San Dorligo della Valle in Italian.  "San Dorligo" (archaically “Durlic”) is the Tergestine dialectal form of the name of the town's patron saint, Ulrich of Augsburg (Sant'Ulderico).

Geographical position 

The municipality of San Dorligo is located on the peninsula of Istria with some settlements on the Karst Plateau. It enjoys a relatively mild Mediterranean climate, although the harsh and cold bora wind frequently blows in the autumn and winter months.

The municipality borders the following municipalities: Koper (Slovenia), Hrpelje-Kozina (Slovenia), Muggia, Sežana (Slovenia), and Trieste.

It has a border crossing with Slovenia at Pesek (Kozina on the Slovenian side). Another crossing is located in the village of Crociata di Prebenico, Caresana, with the Slovenian village of Osp in the Municipality of Koper.

History 

From ancient times, the town was part of the Republic of Venice. From mid 18th century to 1918, the area was under the Habsburg Empire. From 1813 to 1918, the area around San Dorligo was part of the County of Istria in the Austrian Littoral. The great majority (almost the totality) of the population was Slovene-speaking. After World War One, the area was annexed by the Kingdom of Italy, and was included in the administrative region known as the Julian March. In 1945, it was shortly occupied by the Yugoslav People's Army and later by the US and British Armies. Between 1947 and 1954, it was part of the Zone A of the Free Territory of Trieste. In 1954, it came again under Italian jurisdiction.

Culture and traditions 

Home of a spring festival known as the Majenca (held in May) which culminates in the falling of a cherry tree, tied to the top of a tall pole.

San Dorligo is home to the variety of olive tree called bianchera istriana in Italian and istrska belica in Slovene (both meaning "the Istrian white"), known for its endurance to harsh climate and its gentle and high quality olive oil.

Most of the locals speak two Slovenian dialects from the Littoral dialect group: in the majority of the municipality, the Rižana subdialect of the Istrian dialect is spoken, while in some villages in the northern part of the municipality, the Inner Carniolan dialect is spoken.

Pictures

Demographic evolution

See also
Slovene Lands
Slovene minority in Italy

References

External links
 Majenca – the traditional rising of the Maypole

 www.comune.san-dorligo-della-valle.ts.it/

Cities and towns in Friuli-Venezia Giulia
Italy–Slovenia border crossings